The Minister for the Environment was a position in the Luxembourgian cabinet.  Among other competences, the Minister for the Environment is responsible for carrying out government policy on the environment; for ensuring sustainable development; for promoting development of new energy sources; and for protecting forests, parks, and areas of importance to the environment.

The office was first created on 17 June 1974, under the auspices of the Minister for Public Health and the Environment (Ministre de la Santé publique et de l’Environnement).  On 16 September 1977, the environment brief was separated from that of public health, and combined with that of tourism, creating the post of Minister for the Environment and Tourism (Ministre de l’Environnement et du Tourisme).  It was first created as a separate post on 20 July 1979.  It was subsumed within the greater office of Minister for Planning and the Environment (Ministre de l'Aménagement du Territoire et de l’Environnement), between 14 July 1989 and 13 July 1994, before being recreated as a separate position.  On 23 July 2009, it was merged with the positions of Minister for Public Works and Minister for Transport to create the new title of Minister for Sustainable Development and Infrastructure.

List of Ministers for the Environment

Footnotes

References
 
  

 List
Environment, Minister for the